Jean-Marie Aubry (born 3 April 1969 in Forbach, Moselle) is a French retired footballer. He currently plays for the French national Beach Football Team.

References

Stats

1969 births
Living people
People from Forbach
French footballers
RC Strasbourg Alsace players
Angers SCO players
Lille OSC players
AS Monaco FC players
Stade Malherbe Caen players
Ligue 1 players
Ligue 2 players
Association football goalkeepers
French beach soccer players
Sportspeople from Moselle (department)
Footballers from Grand Est